Colosseum Cliff is an impressive banded cliff located between Sykes Glacier and the doleritic rock of Plane Table in the Asgard Range, Victoria Land. The descriptive name, suggestive of the Colosseum in Rome, was applied by the New Zealand Antarctic Place-Names Committee.

References
 

Cliffs of Victoria Land
McMurdo Dry Valleys